Liaoning Huajun Women's Volleyball Club is a professional women's volleyball club based in Yingkou, Liaoning that plays in the Chinese Women's Volleyball Super League.

The team won their first champion title in season 2005-06.

CVSL results

Team Roster of 2020-2021

Former players
  Jiang Ying
  Zhao Hong
  Lai Yawen
  Zhou Hong
  Gao Lin
  Chen Fengqin
  Yang Hao
  Liu Yanan
  Zhang Yuehong
  Chu Jinling
  Wang Yimei
  Li Xiang
  Wang Wanying
  Zhang Xian

References

Chinese volleyball clubs
Sports teams in Liaoning
Women's volleyball teams